Classic bodybuilding competition at the 2014 Asian Beach Games was held in Phuket, Thailand from 21 to 22 November 2014 at Karon Beach, Phuket. There were six events in original program but 176 cm and +176 cm were merged due to lack of entries.

Medalists

Medal table

Results

162 cm

Prejudging
21 November

Final
22 November

165 cm

Prejudging
21 November

Final
22 November

168 cm

Prejudging
21 November

Final
22 November

172 cm

Prejudging
21 November

Final
22 November

+172 cm

Prejudging
21 November

Final
22 November

References 

Results

External links 
 Official website

2014 Asian Beach Games events
2014
Bodybuilding competitions in Thailand
2014 in bodybuilding